The 2018 season was Loughborough Lightning's third season, in which they competed in the Women's Cricket Super League, a Twenty20 competition. The side topped the initial group stage, winning seven of their ten matches, therefore progressing straight to the final. However, they lost in the final to Surrey Stars by 66 runs.

The side was coached by the newly appointed Rob Taylor and captained by Georgia Elwiss. They played four of their home matches at the Haslegrave Ground, and the other at Edgbaston Cricket Ground.

Squad
Loughborough Lightning's 15-player squad is listed below. Age given is at the start of Loughborough Lightning's first match of the season (22 July 2018).

Women's Cricket Super League

Season standings

 Advanced to the Final.
 Advanced to the Semi-final.

League stage

Final

Statistics

Batting

Bowling

Fielding

Wicket-keeping

References

Loughborough Lightning (women's cricket) seasons
2018 in English women's cricket